The 1993–94 Wessex Football League was the eighth season of the Wessex Football League. The league champions for the second time in their history were Wimborne Town. There was no promotion to the Southern League this season, but Whitchurch United were relegated.

For sponsorship reasons, the league was known as the Jewson Wessex League.

League table
The league consisted of one division of 23 clubs, increased from 21 the previous season after Romsey Town were relegated and three new clubs joined:
Andover, after taking voluntary demotion from the Southern League.
Downton, joining from the Hampshire League.
Petersfield Town, a new club formed after the dissolution of Petersfield United, who had been denied permission to switch from the Isthmian League to the Wessex League.

References

Wessex Football League seasons
9